Eric Wimberger (born April 2, 1979) is an American attorney and Republican politician.  He is a member of the Wisconsin State Senate, representing the 30th Senate district since 2021.  The 30th district comprises the cities of Green Bay and De Pere in Brown County, and several municipalities and towns along the west coast of the Green Bay in eastern Oconto and Marinette counties, up to the city of Marinette.

Early life and career
Eric Wimberger was born in 1979 in Green Bay, Wisconsin, and raised in neighboring De Pere.  After graduating from high school, he attended St. Cloud State University in St. Cloud, Minnesota, earning his bachelor's degree in criminal justice in 2001.  Following his undergraduate education, Wimberger spent a year employed as a truck driver for Schneider National, a long-haul trucking company, logging more than 120,000 miles.  He entered Marquette University Law School in 2002. After earning his J.D. in 2005, Wimberger received a commission with the United States Marine Corps.  He spent four years in the Marine Corps, working in the Judge Advocate Division in Japan and Washington, D.C.  He was honorably discharged in 2010 as a captain.

Wimberger returned to the Green Bay area and started his own law firm.

Political career
Wimberger made his first attempt at elected office in 2014, when he ran for Wisconsin State Assembly, challenging first-term Democratic incumbent Eric Genrich in the Green Bay-based 90th Assembly district.  Despite a strong performance statewide by the Republican Party, Genrich prevailed in the general election with nearly 55% of the vote.

Two years later Wimberger made another attempt, this time challenging 16-year incumbent state senator Dave Hansen in the 30th State Senate district.  Wimberger again fell short in the general election, but made a strong showing with nearly 49% of the vote.

In January 2020, Senator Hansen announced he would not seek re-election to a sixth term in 2020.  Wimberger announced in April that he would make another run for the now-open state senate seat.  Wimberger was unopposed in the Republican primary and faced Hansen's nephew, De Pere alderman Jonathon Hansen, in the general election.  The 30th senate was one of the most heavily contested elections in the state, with outside political action committees spending nearly $1,000,000 on both sides of the race.  In one example, Wimberger's legal career came under fire from the Democratic PAC A Better Wisconsin, Together.  One advertisement attacked Wimberger for his defense of a man accused of 213 counts of possessing child pornography.  Another ad attacked him for his treatment of a teenage victim while he was defense counsel for a group of American Marines accused of raping her.  Wimberger asserted that he was only doing his job—providing a vigorous defense for the accused.

Wimberger prevailed with 54% of the vote, one of two state senate pickups for the Republicans in the 2020 election.

Personal life and family
Eric Wimberger lives in De Pere, Wisconsin.  In addition to his legal work, he is a board member of the philanthropic Cloud Family Foundation.  His mother, Wendy Wimberger, owns the Sweet Memories Candy Shoppe in Lakewood, Wisconsin.

Electoral history

Wisconsin Assembly (2014)

| colspan="6" style="text-align:center;background-color: #e9e9e9;"| General Election, November 4, 2014

Wisconsin Senate (2016)

| colspan="6" style="text-align:center;background-color: #e9e9e9;"| General Election, November 8, 2016

Wisconsin Senate (2020)

| colspan="6" style="text-align:center;background-color: #e9e9e9;"| General Election, November 3, 2020

References

External links
 
 
 Senator Eric Wimberger at Wisconsin Legislature
 Campaign website (Archived - 11/3/2020)
 Law Office of Eric R Wimberger LLC (Archived - 10/20/2020)
 Sweet Memories Candy Shoppe
 30th Senate District (2011–2021)

Living people
Politicians from Green Bay, Wisconsin
People from De Pere, Wisconsin
Military personnel from Wisconsin
Republican Party Wisconsin state senators
21st-century American politicians
St. Cloud State University alumni
Marquette University Law School alumni
United States Marine Corps Judge Advocate Division
1979 births